This is a list of awards sponsored by International PEN centres. There are over 145 PEN centres on the world, some of which hold annual literary awards. The PEN American Center awards have been characterized as being among the "major" literary awards in America.

PEN America

PEN/Faulkner Foundation

PEN Center USA

PEN New England (today PEN America Boston)

PEN Oakland

English PEN

Irish PEN

Portuguese PEN Club

International PEN

Sydney PEN

PEN Centre Germany

Hungarian PEN Club

Norsk PEN

See also

List of literary awards

References

External links
 PEN America Literary Awards
 Web archive: PEN American Center, awards page (2012)
 Web archive: PEN Center USA, awards page (2009)
 English PEN: Prizes

PEN literary awards
PEN litereary